Shubh Mangal Savdhan to refer
 Shubh Mangal Savdhan is a Marathi film in 1992.
 Shubha Mangal Saavadhan is a Marathi comedy drama film in 2006
 Shubh Mangal Savdhan (2017 film) is a Hindi drama film in released in 2017